SN 2007uy was a supernova that occurred in the spiral galaxy NGC 2770. It was discovered by Yoji Hirose on December 31, 2007 from Chigasaki city in Japan, approximately four days after the explosion. It was identified as a Type Ib supernova from its spectrum a week before reaching maximum, and appeared the most similar to SN 2004gq.

Emissions from SN 2007uy were detected from the X-ray to the radio band. The light from this event was heavily reddened due to intervening dust in the host galaxy. The progenitor was likely a massive star that had been stripped of its hydrogen envelope by a binary companion. There is no radio evidence of a relativistic jet of the type that would be associated with a gamma-ray burst.

While interesting in its own right, SN 2007uy was overshadowed by SN 2008D, a supernova whose burst was observed serendipitously while SN 2007uy was being studied by Swift, something unprecedented in astronomy. This second supernova occurred within ten days of the first.

References

External links
 Light curves and spectra on the Open Supernova Catalog
 IAUC 8908 IAU Circular announcing the discovery.

Supernovae
Lynx (constellation)
20071231